Drabiv Raion was a raion (district) of Cherkasy Oblast, central Ukraine. Its administrative centre was located at the urban-type settlement of Drabiv. The raion was abolished on 18 July 2020 as part of the administrative reform of Ukraine, which reduced the number of raions of Cherkasy Oblast to four. The area of Drabiv Raion was merged into Zolotonosha Raion. The last estimate of the raion population was  

At the time of disestablishment, the raion consisted of three hromadas:
 Drabiv settlement hromada with the administration in Drabiv;
 Shramkivka rural hromada with the administration in the selo of Shramkivka;
 Velykyi Khutir rural hromada with the administration in the selo of Velykyi Khutir.

References

Former raions of Cherkasy Oblast
1923 establishments in Ukraine
Ukrainian raions abolished during the 2020 administrative reform